CJML-FM is a radio station in Milton, Ontario broadcasting on 101.3 MHz. Owned by Local Radio Lab Inc., the station covers the immediate Milton area from its transmitter at X. The CRTC first received an application from My Broadcasting Corporation on May 27, 2015. On August 2, 2017, the station was finally able to sign on the air. It also receives co-channel interference east of Milton due to CJSA-FM in Toronto also broadcasting on the same frequency and also CKOT-FM in Tillsonburg. On April 8, 2020 the CRTC approved an application by My Broadcasting Corporation (MBC) to increase the average effective radiated power (ERP) from 228 to 480 watts (maximum ERP from 950 to 2,000 watts) and by changing the orientation of its directional antenna. CJML-FM will remain at 101.3 MHz.

On June 25, 2021, the CRTC approved the sale of CJML, as well as its sister stations CIMA-FM/Alliston and CKMO-FM/Orangeville, to Local Radio Lab.

References

External links 
 FM 101 Milton
 

Jml
Jml
Radio stations established in 2017
2017 establishments in Ontario
JML